Gangrar railway station is a railway station in Chittorgarh district, Rajasthan. Its code is GGR. It serves Gangrar. The station consists of a single platform. Passenger, Express trains halt here.

References

Railway stations in Chittorgarh district
Ajmer railway division